The 2014 6 Hours of Silverstone was an endurance sports car racing event held at the Silverstone Circuit near Silverstone, England on 17–20 April 2014.  The event served as the opening round of the 2014 World Endurance Championship, and overall race winners were awarded the annual Tourist Trophy by the Royal Automobile Club.  Toyota became the first Japanese manufacturer to win Silverstone's endurance race, with Anthony Davidson, Sébastien Buemi, and Nicolas Lapierre leading the team's second TS040 Hybrid to a 1–2 finish.  The race, which had run under mixed weather conditions, was stopped in the final half-hour of competition due to heavy rains and not restarted.

Porsche, making their return to the prototype categories with the debuting 919 Hybrid, completed the overall race podium with third place. Accidents ended the race of both Audi R18 e-tron quattro cars after the World Champions had started strongly.  Rebellion Racing's Nicolas Prost, Nick Heidfeld, and Mathias Beche were the only team to reach the finish in the LMP1-L category, while G-Drive Racing's Morgan-Nissan won the LMP2 class.  Lock-out 1–2 victories were also earned by Porsche in LMGTE Pro and British marque Aston Martin in LMGTE Am.

Qualifying results

Pole position winners in each class are marked in bold.

Race

Race result
Class winners in bold.

See also
 2014 4 Hours of Silverstone

References

Silverstone
Silverstone
6 Hours of Silverstone
RAC Tourist Trophy